"Da Funk" is an instrumental track by French electronic music duo Daft Punk, initially released as a single in 1995 and later included on their debut album, Homework (1997). The song and its accompanying music video directed by Spike Jonze are considered classics of 1990s house music. It went on to sell 30,000 copies in 1997. A reversed clip of "Da Funk" was also released on Homework as "Funk Ad", which is the final track on the album.

Background
"Da Funk" was initially released as a 12-inch single in 1995 under the Soma Quality Recordings label, with the B-side "Rollin' & Scratchin'". The pressing was limited to 2,000 copies and was "virtually ignored" according to a Muzik magazine feature at the time. The single received a boost in popularity when the Chemical Brothers incorporated it into their live shows. Subsequently, the British duo's song "Life Is Sweet" was remixed by Daft Punk for a single release in August 1995.

Daft Punk eventually signed with Virgin Records after a bidding war amongst several labels. "Da Funk" was re-released in early 1997 by Virgin with the B-side "Musique", a track that later appeared on the anthology Musique Vol. 1 1993–2005. The duo's debut album Homework features "Da Funk" as well as a reversed excerpt titled "Funk Ad". Daft Punk expressed that they wanted to make the album balanced by distributing tracks evenly across each of the four vinyl sides.

Composition
In an interview with Fredrik Strage for Swedish magazine Pop #23, Bangalter revealed that "Da Funk" was made after listening to American G-funk for weeks:

It was around the time Warren G's "Regulate" was released and we wanted to make some sort of gangsta rap and tried to murk our sounds as much as possible. However, no one has ever compared it to hip hop. We've heard that the drums sound like Queen and the Clash, the melody is reminiscent of Giorgio Moroder, and the synthesisers sound like electro and thousand of other comparisons. No one agrees with us that it sounds like hip hop.

The riff was originally a siren sound, but was changed to reflect the "gangsta rap" aesthetic they were trying to achieve. The bassline was created with a Roland TB-303 synthesizer Bangalter purchased in 1993. He had created several patterns with the 303 beforehand: "When we were looking for a bassline, we listened to some of [the] ones I'd already programmed and took the one that fit best." Da Funk is written in the key of C minor, and composed with a tempo of 111 beats per minute.

Critical reception
Larry Flick from Billboard described the track as a "wriggling instrumental combination of cutting-edge electronic dance and Cameo-styled funk". Andy Beevers from Music Week'''s RM Dance Update rated it five out of five, adding that "this single is a bit of a refresher for those who have been wondering why there is so much hype surrounding the French duo." He explained further, "'Da Funk' still sounds incredibly fresh with its huge distorted synth riffs, thumping rhythm and scratchy guitar mashed up to create a mutant disco gem." Dave Fawbert from ShortList declared it as "sensational", stating that it "manages to combine about six different outrageously funky parts over the top of an unyielding, solitary, bass note. When the 303 finally kicks in, it’s electro ecstasy." David Sinclair from The Times commented, "Another rave standard goes overground."

Music video

The track's music video was directed by Spike Jonze in February 1997 and titled Big City Nights. It focuses on the character Charles (Tony Maxwell), an anthropomorphic dog in a leg cast with a crutch. Charles, who has lived in New York City for only one month, is shown walking around with a boombox blasting "Da Funk" at a high volume. His hobbled walk is mocked by a pair of children. He is turned down when he attempts to participate in a public survey. His boombox annoys a bookseller on the sidewalk from whom Charles buys a paperback novel titled Big City Nights. Charles meets a woman named Beatrice (Catherine Kellner), who was once his childhood neighbor. They agree to have dinner together at her home, traveling by way of a city bus. Beatrice boards the bus, but Charles is startled by a sign stating "NO RADIOS". As he is unable to turn off his boombox (which is earlier indicated to have a broken/missing volume button) he reluctantly remains at the bus stop, as the bus drives off with Beatrice.

Although the video has drawn several interpretations, Thomas Bangalter has stated:

Charles starred in the music video for "Fresh", another song on the Homework album. Set several years after "Da Funk", Charles is shown to have become a successful movie star who is respected by many of his colleagues and is now living with Beatrice.

Impact and legacy
The prominent French club magazine Coda named "Da Funk" the number one single with 33 percent of the vote. In 2003, Q Magazine ranked it number 670 in their list of the 1001 Best Songs Ever. 

In September 2010, Pitchfork Media included the song at number 18 on their Top 200 Tracks of the 90s. In 2011, it was featured in the video games Top Spin 4 and Ubisoft's Just Dance 3. Same year, Slant Magazine listed it at number 93 in their ranking of The 100 Best Singles of the 1990s. 

In 2012, NME listed it in their 100 Best Songs of the 1990s, at number eight. In 2021, Mixdown featured "Da Funk" in their list of The 13 most iconic TB-303 basslines of all time.Rolling Stone ranked "Da Funk" number 23 in their list of 200 Greatest Dance Songs of All Time'' in 2022.

Track listing

Charts and certifications

Weekly charts

Year-end charts

Certifications

Release history

References

1995 singles
1995 songs
1997 singles
Daft Punk songs
French house songs
Music videos directed by Spike Jonze
Songs written by Guy-Manuel de Homem-Christo
Songs written by Thomas Bangalter
Virgin Records singles